American Division may refer to:

 American Division (NHL), a former division of the National Hockey League
 South Division (CFL), a former American-only division of the Canadian Football League

See also
 For information on United States military divisions, see United States Army